Estradiol 17β-acetate is an estrogen and an estrogen ester—specifically, the C17β acetate ester of estradiol—which was never marketed. It is the C17β positional isomer of the better-known and clinically used estradiol ester estradiol acetate (estradiol 3-acetate; Femtrace).

See also
 List of estrogen esters § Estradiol esters

References

Abandoned drugs
Acetate esters
Estradiol esters
Prodrugs
Secondary alcohols
Synthetic estrogens